Jan Tomáš "Miloš" Forman (18 February 1932 – 13 April 2018) was a Czech and American film director, screenwriter, actor, and professor who rose to fame in his native Czechoslovakia before emigrating to the United States in 1968.

Forman was an important figure in the Czechoslovak New Wave. Film scholars and Czechoslovak authorities saw his 1967 film The Firemen's Ball as a biting satire on Eastern European Communism. The film was initially shown in theatres in his home country in the more reformist atmosphere of the Prague Spring. However, it was later banned by the Communist government after the invasion by the Warsaw Pact countries in 1968. Forman was subsequently forced to leave Czechoslovakia for the United States, where he continued making films, gaining wider critical and financial success. In 1975, he directed One Flew Over the Cuckoo's Nest (1975) starring Jack Nicholson as a patient in a mental institution. The film received widespread acclaim and was the second in history to win all five major Academy Awards: Best Picture, Director, Screenplay, Actor in Leading Role, and Actress in Leading Role.

In 1978, he directed the anti-war musical Hair which premiered at the 1979 Cannes Film Festival. In 1981, he directed the turn of the century drama film, Ragtime, which was known for its large ensemble cast. The film went on to receive eight Academy Award nominations. His next feature was a period biographical film, Amadeus (1984), based on the life of famed classical musician Wolfgang Amadeus Mozart starring Tom Hulce, and F. Murray Abraham. The film was both a critical and financial success earning eleven nominations with eight wins including for Best Picture, and another win for Forman as Best Director. In 1996, Forman received another Academy Award nomination for Best Director for The People vs. Larry Flynt (1996).

Throughout Forman's career he won two Academy Awards, three Golden Globe Awards, Grand Prix at the Cannes Film Festival, Golden Bear at the Berlin Film Festival, a British Academy Film Award, a César Award, David di Donatello Award, and the Czech Lion.

Early life
Miloš Forman's childhood was marked by the early loss of his parents. His mother, Anna Formanová, was murdered in 1943 in the Auschwitz concentration camp, and his father, Rudolf Forman, in the Mittelbau-Dora concentration camp in 1944. Close relatives and friends of his parents raised him. After attending grammar school in Náchod, he went to a boarding school in Poděbrady following the end of the war; among his class-mates were Václav Havel and Jerzy Skolimowski.

Career
Along with cinematographer Miroslav Ondříček and long-time friend from school Ivan Passer, Forman filmed the silent documentary Semafor about the Semafor theater. Forman's first important production was Audition, a documentary about competing singers. He directed several Czech comedies in Czechoslovakia. He was in Paris negotiating the production of his first American film during the Prague Spring in 1968. His employer, a Czech studio, fired him, so he decided to move to the United States. He moved to New York, where he later became a professor of film at Columbia University in 1978 and co-chair (with his former teacher František Daniel) of Columbia's film department. One of his protégés was future director James Mangold, whom he mentored at Columbia. He regularly collaborated with cinematographer Miroslav Ondříček.

1960s

Black Peter (1964)

Black Peter is one of the first and most representative films of the Czechoslovak New Wave. It won the Golden Leopard award at the Locarno International Film Festival.

It covers the first few days in the working life of a Czech teenager. In Czechoslovakia in 1964, the aimless Petr (Ladislav Jakim) starts work as a security guard in a busy self-service supermarket; unfortunately, he is so lacking in confidence that even when he sees shoplifters, he cannot bring himself to confront them. He is similarly tongue-tied with the lovely Asa (Pavla Martínková) and during the lectures about personal responsibility and the dignity of labor that his blustering father (Jan Vostrčil) delivers at home.

Loves of a Blonde (1965)

Loves of a Blonde is one of the best–known movies of the Czechoslovak New Wave, and won awards at the Venice and Locarno film festivals. It was also nominated for the Academy Award for Best Foreign Language Film in 1967.

The Firemen's Ball (1967)

A 1967 originally Czechoslovak–Italian co-production, this was Forman's first color film. It is one of the best–known movies of the Czechoslovak New Wave. On the face of it a naturalistic representation of an ill-fated social event in a provincial town, the film has been seen by both film scholars and the then-authorities in Czechoslovakia as a biting satire on East European Communism, which resulted in it being banned for many years in Forman's home country. The Czech term zhasnout (to switch lights off), associated with petty theft in the film, was used to describe the large-scale asset stripping that occurred in the country during the 1990s.

It was nominated for the Academy Award for Best Foreign Film.

1970s

Taking Off (1971)

The first movie Forman made in the United States, Taking Off won the Grand Prix at the 1971 Cannes Film Festival. The film starred Lynn Carlin and Buck Henry, and also featured Linnea Heacock as Jeannie. The film was critically panned and left Forman struggling to find work. Forman later said that it did so poorly he ended up owing the studio $500.

One Flew Over the Cuckoo's Nest (1975)

Despite the failure of Taking Off, producers Michael Douglas and Saul Zaentz hired him to direct the adaptation of Ken Kesey's cult novel One Flew Over the Cuckoo's Nest. Forman later said they hired him because he was in their price range. Starring Jack Nicholson and Louise Fletcher, the adaptation was a critical and commercial success. The film won Oscars in the five most important categories: Best Director, Best Actor, Best Actress, Best Picture and Best Adapted Screenplay. One of only three films in history to do so (alongside It Happened One Night and The Silence of the Lambs), it firmly established Forman's reputation.

Hair (1979)

The success of One Flew Over the Cuckoo's Nest allowed Forman to direct his long-planned film version of Hair in 1979, a rock musical based on the Broadway musical by James Rado, Gerome Ragni, and Galt MacDermot. The film starred Treat Williams, John Savage and Beverly D'Angelo. It was disowned by the writers of the original musical, and, although it received positive reviews, it did not do well financially.

1980s

Ragtime (1981)

It is a 1981 American drama film directed by Miloš Forman, based on the 1975 historical novel Ragtime by E.L. Doctorow.

Amadeus (1984)

Forman's next important achievement was an adaptation of Peter Shaffer's Amadeus. Retelling the story of Wolfgang Amadeus Mozart and Antonio Salieri, it starred Tom Hulce, Elizabeth Berridge, and F. Murray Abraham. The film was internationally acclaimed and won eight Oscars, including Best Picture, Best Director, and Best Actor (for Abraham).

Valmont (1989)

Forman's adaptation of Pierre Choderlos de Laclos's novel Les Liaisons dangereuses had its premiere on 17 November 1989. Another film adaptation by Stephen Frears from the same source material had been released the previous year and overshadowed Forman's adaptation. The film starred Colin Firth, Meg Tilly, and Annette Bening.

1990s

The People vs. Larry Flynt (1996)

The 1996 biographical film of the pornography mogul Larry Flynt brought Forman another directing Oscar nomination. The film starred Woody Harrelson, Courtney Love, and Edward Norton. Though critically acclaimed, it grossed only $20 million at the box office.

Man on the Moon (1999)

The biography of famous actor and avant-garde comic Andy Kaufman (Jim Carrey, who won a Golden Globe for his performance) premiered on 22 December 1999. The film also starred Danny DeVito, Courtney Love, and Paul Giamatti. Several actors from One Flew Over the Cuckoo's Nest appeared in the film, including DeVito.

2000s
In 2000, Forman performed alongside actor Edward Norton in Norton's directorial debut, Keeping the Faith (2000), as the wise friend to Norton's conflicted priest.

Goya's Ghosts (2006)

This biography of the Spanish painter Francisco Goya (an American-Spanish co-production) premiered on 8 November 2006. The film starred Natalie Portman, Javier Bardem, Stellan Skarsgård and Randy Quaid. It struggled at the box office.

Unfinished projects
In the late 1950s, Forman and Josef Škvorecký started adapting Škvorecký's short story Eine kleine Jazzmusik for the screen. The script, named Kapela to vyhrála (The Band Won It), tells the story of a student jazz band during the Nazi Occupation of Czechoslovakia. The script was submitted to Barrandov Film Studios. The studio required changes and both artists continued to rewrite the script. Right before the film started shooting, the whole project was completely scrapped, most probably due to intervention from people at the top of the political scene, as Škvorecký had just published his novel The Cowards, which was strongly criticized by communist politicians. The story Eine kleine Jazzmusik was dramatized as a TV film in the 1990s. In the spring and summer of 1968, Škvorecký and Forman cooperated again by jointly writing a script synopsis to make a film version of The Cowards. After Škvorecký fled the Warsaw Pact invasion the synopsis was translated into English, but no film was made.

In the mid-1960s Forman, Passer and Papoušek were working on a script about a soldier secretly living in Lucerna Palace in Prague. They got stuck writing the script and went to a village firemen's ball. Inspired by the experience they decided to cancel the script and write The Firemen's Ball instead.

In early 1970s Forman worked on a script with Thomas Berger based on his novel Vital Parts.

In the early 1990s, Forman co-wrote a screenplay with Adam Davidson. The screenplay, titled Hell Camp, was about an American-Japanese love affair in the world of sumo wrestlers. The picture was funded by TriStar Pictures and cancelled just four days before shooting because of the disapproval of the Japan Sumo Association, while Forman refused to make the changes requested by the association.

In the early 2000s, Forman developed a film project to be titled Ember, adapted by Jean-Claude Carrière from Hungarian novelist Sándor Márai’s novel. The film was about two men in the former Austria-Hungary Empire from different social backgrounds who become friends in military school and meet again 41 years later. Forman cast Sean Connery and Klaus Maria Brandauer as well as Winona Ryder. Several months before shooting, Sean Connery and the Italian producer had a disagreement and Connery withdrew from the project. Forman was so convinced that Sean Connery fit the role that he didn't want to shoot the film without him and cancelled the project a few days before the shooting was due to start.

In the late 2000s, the screenplay for Ghost of Munich was written by Forman, Jean-Claude Carriere, and Václav Havel (the former Czech president and writer, who had studied at school with Forman), inspired by the novel by the French novelist Georges-Marc Benamou. The story takes a closer look at the events that surrounded the Munich Agreement. The role of the French Prime Minister Édouard Daladier was supposed to have been played by the French actor Mathieu Amalric with his older self played by Gérard Depardieu. However, the production company Pathé was not able to fund the project.

Personal life

Forman was born in Čáslav, Czechoslovakia (now the Czech Republic) to Anna Švábová Forman who ran a summer hotel. When young, he believed his biological father to be professor Rudolf Forman. His parents attended a Protestant church. During the Nazi occupation, Rudolf Forman, a member of the resistance, was arrested for distributing banned books, and reportedly died from typhus in Mittelbau-Dora, a subcamp of the Buchenwald concentration camp in May 1944. Another version has it that he died in Mittelbau-Dora during interrogation. Forman's mother had been murdered in Auschwitz in March the previous year. Forman said that he did not fully understand what had happened to them until he saw footage of the concentration camps when he was 16.

Forman was subsequently raised by two uncles and by family friends. His older brother Pavel was a painter 12 years his senior and he emigrated to Australia after the 1968 invasion of Czechoslovakia. Forman later discovered that his biological father was in fact the Jewish architect Otto Kohn, a survivor of the Holocaust, and Forman was thus a half-brother of mathematician Joseph J. Kohn.

In his youth, Forman wanted to become a theatrical producer. After the war, he attended the King George boarding school in Poděbrady, where his fellow students included Václav Havel, the Mašín brothers, and future film-makers Ivan Passer and Jerzy Skolimowski. He later studied screenwriting at the Academy of Performing Arts in Prague. He was assistant of Alfréd Radok, creator of Laterna Magika. Along with fellow filmmaker and friend Passer, he left Europe for the United States during the Warsaw Pact invasion of Czechoslovakia in summer 1968.

Forman's first wife was Czech movie star Jana Brejchová. They met while making Štěňata (1957). They divorced in 1962. Forman had twin sons with his second wife Czech actress and singer . They separated in 1969. Forman married  on 28 November 1999, and they also had twin sons Jim and Andy (born 1999).

Forman was professor emeritus of film at Columbia University. In 1996, asteroid 11333 Forman was named after him. He wrote poems and published the autobiography Turnaround in 1994. After a short illness, he died at Danbury Hospital near his home in Warren, Connecticut on 13 April 2018 at age 86. He is interred at New Warren Cemetery in Warren, Connecticut.

Work

Film 

Documentary

Short Films

Television

Acting credits

Theatre

Awards and nominations

Honours and legacy 
In 1977, he became a naturalized citizen of the United States. In 1985, he headed the Cannes Film Festival and in 2000 did the same for the Venice Film Festival. He presided over a César Award ceremony in 1988. In April 2007, he took part in the jazz opera Dobře placená procházka, itself a remake of the TV film he made in 1966. It premiered at the Prague National Theatre, directed by Forman's son, Petr Forman. Named 30th greatest Czech by Největší Čech Forman's films One Flew Over the Cuckoo's Nest and Amadeus were selected for the National Film Registry as being "culturally, historically, or aesthetically significant" in 1993 and 2019 respectively

1965: Awarded the state prize of Klement Gottwald for Loves of a Blonde
1997: The Crystal Globe award for outstanding artistic contribution to world cinema at the Karlovy Vary International Film Festival.
1998: Awarded a lifetime Achievement award by the Czech Lion Awards for his contributions to Czech cinema
1995: Awarded Czech Medal of Merit
2006: Awarded the Hanno R. Ellenbogen Citizenship Award
2009: Forman received an honorary degree from Emerson College in Boston, Massachusetts, US.
2015: Awarded honorary Doctor of humane letters degree by Columbia University

See also

 List of Big Five Academy Award winners and nominees
 List of Czech Academy Award winners and nominees

References 
The Milos Forman Stories von Antonin J. Liehm (ISBN 978-1-138-65829-5)

External links

Bibliography of books and articles about Forman via UC Berkeley Media Resources Center
Interview with Milos Forman: Defender of the Artist and the Common Man
Miloš Forman profile

1932 births
2018 deaths
Akira Kurosawa Award winners
American film directors
American film producers
American people of Czech descent
American people of Czech-Jewish descent
Best Director BAFTA Award winners
Best Directing Academy Award winners
Best Director Golden Globe winners
European Film Awards winners (people)
Columbia University faculty
Czechoslovak emigrants to the United States
Czech film directors
Czech people of Jewish descent
English-language film directors
Academy of Performing Arts in Prague alumni
American male screenwriters
American male film actors
Czechoslovak film directors
Recipients of Medal of Merit (Czech Republic)
People from Čáslav
David di Donatello winners
Chevaliers of the Légion d'honneur
Holocaust survivors
Silver Bear for Best Director recipients
Directors of Golden Bear winners
20th-century American male actors
21st-century American male actors
Directors Guild of America Award winners
American people of Jewish descent
Burials in Connecticut